C. A. Moore Airport  is a public use airport located two nautical miles (4 km) northeast of the central business district of Lexington, a city in Holmes County, Mississippi, United States. Owned by the City of Lexington, it is included in the National Plan of Integrated Airport Systems for 2011–2015, which categorized it as a general aviation facility.

Facilities and aircraft 
C. A. Moore Airport covers an area of 90 acres (36 ha) at an elevation of 340 feet (104 m) above mean sea level. It has one runway designated 1/19 with an asphalt surface measuring 3,199 by 60 feet (975 x 18 m).

For the 12-month period ending February 23, 2012, the airport had 2,575 general aviation aircraft operations, an average of 214 per month. At that time there were four single-engine aircraft based at this airport.

See also 
 List of airports in Mississippi

References

External links 
 
 

Airports in Mississippi
Transportation in Holmes County, Mississippi
Buildings and structures in Holmes County, Mississippi